Semolina is the middlings of durum wheat.

Semolina may also refer to:
 Semolina (horse), a racehorse
 Semolina (moth), a genus of moth
 Semolina pudding, or semolina porridge, made from semolina